Really may refer to:

 Really (album), by JJ Cale
 Really (TV channel)
Really, a 2006 film starring Philip Arditti
Really, a 2000 album by David Huff
"Really", a 2018 song by Blackpink from Square Up

See also
 
 Real (disambiguation)